Anta (Quechua for copper, also spelled Anda) is a  mountain in the Andes of Peru. It is located in the Cusco Region, Canchis Province, on the border of the districts of Checacupe and San Pablo. Anta lies near the Chhuyumayu valley, southeast of Jach'a Sirk'i and Wari Sallani.

References

Mountains of Peru
Mountains of Cusco Region